Silver Screen may refer to:

 Silver screen, a type of projection screen
 Silverscreen, a British retail chain
 Silver Screen (Poland), a Polish cinema chain
 Silver Screen (magazine), an American film magazine (1930–77)
 Silver Screen (novel), a science fiction novel by Justina Robson
 Silver Screen Classics, a Canadian cable TV channel
 Silver Screen Partners, an American theatrical motion picture financier
 Silver Screen Pictures, an Indian film company
 Silver Screen Awards Competition, Singapore International Film Festival
 Silver Screen Handicap, an American Thoroughbred horse race, now known as the Affirmed Handicap

 Similarly named
 Songs of the Silver Screen, studio album by Sons of the San Joaquin

Others
 Movie theatre, sometimes referred to as the silver screen.